The Sri Lanka national cricket team toured the West Indies in March and April 2008 to play two Test matches and three Limited Overs Internationals.

Squads

Tour Matches

GCB President's XI v Sri Lankans

West Indies A v Sri Lankans

Test series

First Test

Second Test

ODI series

First ODI

Second ODI

Third ODI

References

External links
 Tour home at ESPN Cricinfo

2008
West Indian cricket seasons from 2000–01
International cricket competitions in 2007–08
2008 in West Indian cricket
2008 in Sri Lankan cricket